Rajmala is  a  chronicle of the Kings of Tripura, written in Bengali verse in the 15th century under Dharma Manikya I.

Overview
The Rajmala chronicles the history of the Manikya kings of Tripura. While it serves as an invaluable source of information for the region, its historical accuracy in some aspects has been doubted.

The text is split up into six parts, written over the course of several centuries under the patronage of different Tripura monarchs. It was initially commissioned by Dharma Manikya I in 1458, who bestowed the task upon the royal priest Durlabhendra and two Brahman pandits, Sukheshwar and Baneshwar. Their work formed the first part of the text and covered the traditional period of Tripura's history and incorporated various mythological accounts. Subsequent portions were composed during the 16th, 17th, 18th and 19th centuries under Amar Manikya, Govinda Manikya , Krishna Manikya and Kashi Chandra Manikya respectively. The entire revised text was finally compiled by Durgamoni Uzir during the reign of Krishna Kishore Manikya in the mid-19th-century.

Royal genealogy
The Rajmala presents a  list of 149 kings of Twipra as of 1431.  The first king of the chronicle is Chandra, the Moon himself; the seventh is Druhyu, one of the sons of Yayati, a Lunar dynasty in mythology. 
The 46th king is called Tripur (Tripura) as a kind of mythological eponymous ancestor of the Sanskritic name of the kingdom.  
The list of historical kings begins with the 145th king, Ratna Fa (fl. 1280). He was the first to assume the title Manikya and as such can be considered the founder of the Manikya Dynasty.

Mythological or legendary kings

118. Hamtor Fa (Jujaru Fa or Himti or Birraj), see also Twipra Era 
119. Jangi Fa (Rajendra or Janak Fa)
120. Partha (Debrai or Debraj) 
121. Sebrai 
122. Durgur Fa (Dankuru Fa, Harirai, Kirit, Adhidharma Fa) 
123. Kharung Fa (Kurung Fa, Ramchandra) 
124. Sengfanai (Nrisingha, Singhafani) 
125. Lalit Rai 
126. Mukunda Fa (Kunda Fa)
127. Kamal Rai
128. Krishnadas
129. Jash Fa (Jashoraj)
130. Muchung Fa (Udwab)
131. Sadhu Rai
132. Pratap Rai
133. Vishnuprasad
134. Baneshwar (Baneeshwar)
135. Beerbahu
136. Samrat
137. Champakeshwar (Champa)
138. Meghraj (Megh)
139. Sengkwchak (Dharmadhar)
140. Sengthum Fa (Kirtidhar, Singhatung Fa)
141. Achong Fa (Rajsurjya, Kunjaham Fa)
142. Khichung Fa (Mohon)
143. Dangar Fa (Harirai)
144. Raja Fa

Historical kings
see List of Tripuri Kings for the  post-Rajmala kings.
145. Ratna Fa (Ratna Manikya) fl. 1280 
146. Pratap Manikya
147. Mukut Manikya (Mukunda)
148. Maha Manikya
149. Dharma Manikya fl. 1430

See also
 Tripura
 Tripuri people
Tripura (princely state)

References

External links
 Tripura.com

History of Tripura
Kings of Tripura